The 1971–72 UC Irvine Anteaters men's basketball team represented the University of California, Irvine during the 1971–72 NCAA College Division men's basketball season. The Anteaters were led by third year head coach Tim Tift and played their home games at Crawford Hall. The anteaters finished the season with an overall record of 16–12.

Previous season
The 1970–71 UC Irvine Anteaters men's basketball team finished the season with a record of 16–12 under second year head coach Tim Tift and were not invited to a post season tournament.

Roster

Schedule

|-
!colspan=9 style=|Regular season

|-
!colspan=12 style="background:#;"| NCAA Tournament

Source

References

UC Irvine Anteaters men's basketball seasons
UC Irvine Anteaters
UC Irvine Anteaters